Costal may refer to:

 an adjective related to the rib in anatomy
 Costal cartilage, a type of cartilage forming bars which serve to prolong the ribs forward
 Costal margin, the medial margin formed by the false ribs
 Costal surface (disambiguation)
 Costal groove, a groove between the ridge of the internal surface of the rib
 Costal vein, a type of insect wing segment in the Comstock–Needham system

See also
 Costa (disambiguation)
 Costas (disambiguation)
 Coastal
 Intercostal (disambiguation)